The development of writing and literacy in America can be viewed in period of time from 1000 BCE up to until around 1830 CE. During this period, indigenous civilizations invented a scribing system in 1000 BCE which developed into an alphabet by 600 BCE. Colonization and missionary works aimed to convert the native people and make them civilized. Enslaved people used writing as a tool to better their condition. Women of new American republic taught their children to read and write as education was vital in democracy.

Mesoamerica (pre-1492) 
The first written system in Mesoamerica was created approximately 900 BCE in modern-day Veracruz by the Olmec. There is only one known Olmec writing. It is the earliest identified piece of writing in the Western Hemisphere. Although there is so few samples. The Olmec cuneiform tends to repeat certain graphemes which may indicate it is a writing system or syllabary. Olmec people all over the empire used this writing system. The first phonetic written language of Mesoamerica arrived in 600 BCE by the Zapotec. This tonal writing system contained “five vowels (/a e i o u/) and 25 consonants (/b s k tʃ kw d dʒ g w h l m n nʲ p k r s t ts ʒ ʃ j z ʔ/). Zapotec scribes were seen as artists and were often called huezeequichi, meaning an artist on paper. They developed a highly advanced 260-day ritual calendar, and a 365-day secular calendar from their knowledge in astronomy. The Mayan is one of the longest-lived and well documented writing systems of Mesoamerica. The alphabet was much more complicated, containing short and long vowels, and diphthongs. In North America all native forms of writing formed after contact with Europeans. The colonists introducing writing to the native Cherokee ignited the development of their own writing system. The Language also was greatly impacted by the forcible migration of 16,000 Cherokee people to Oklahoma on the Trail of Tears,

Colonialism (1492–1776) 
The first widely published work  from the colony's  Brevissima Relacion An account by the Spanish Dominican friar Bartolomé de las Casas in 1542 (published in 1552) about the mistreatment of and atrocities committed against the indigenous peoples of the Americas in colonial times and sent to then Prince Philip II of Spain. American south were barred from learning to read and write by most owners. Literacy was and still is a symbol of humanity, and freedom. If word got out that a master was teaching his slaves, then his legitimacy hit. Slaves learned to read and write anyway. In 1723 A group of slaves in Virginia anonymously wrote a letter to the Anglican Bishop of London. The slaves asked the bishop to provide religious and reading education to slave children.

Early America (1776–1830) 
After the revolutionary war, The new United States of America  put education as a key key for the new republic. Women and mothers became responsible for educating children on how to read and be functioning citizens.  In the 18th century a new form of communication became popular for American Colonists. Familial letter writing changed how people communicated, an entire formats rules on formatting and phrasing were developed.

References 

History of writing
Cultural history of the United States
History of North America
History of South America